Lancaster station is owned by and located in the city of Lancaster, California.

History 
Metrolink's Antelope Valley Line originally terminated in Santa Clarita, and was named the Santa Clarita line. Its plans to extend the line were expedited by almost 10 years following the 1994 Northridge earthquake, which collapsed sections of the SR 14 and I-5 freeways. The Navy Seabee construction battalion and crews from the Los Angeles County Department of Public Works built an emergency Lancaster station in three days, and Metrolink service began on January 24, one week after the earthquake.

Connecting services 
Antelope Valley Transit Authority:
4 – Eastside Lancaster
7 – Rancho Vista/Lancaster
9 – Quartz Hill via Avenue H
11 – East/West Lancaster via Avenue I
785 – Downtown Los Angeles
786 – Century City/West Los Angeles
787 – West San Fernando Valley
790 – North County TRANSporter
Eastern Sierra Transit:
395 South (Mammoth Lakes – Lancaster)
Kern Transit:
100 – Bakersfield/Lancaster
250 – California City/Lancaster

References

External links 

Metrolink stations in Los Angeles County, California
Transportation in Lancaster, California
Amtrak Thruway Motorcoach stations in Los Angeles County, California
Railway stations in the United States opened in 1994
1994 establishments in California